The yellow and violet-bellied mountain skink (Leptosiaphos ianthinoxantha) is a species of lizard in the family Scincidae. It is found in Cameroon.

References

Leptosiaphos

Reptiles described in 1975
Reptiles of Cameroon
Endemic fauna of Cameroon
Taxa named by Wolfgang Böhme (herpetologist)
Fauna of the Cameroonian Highlands forests